N-Ethylnorketamine (ethketamine, NENK, 2-Cl-2'-Oxo-PCE) is a designer drug which is presumed to have similar properties to ketamine, a dissociative anesthetic drug with hallucinogenic and sedative effects. It has been sold over the internet since around September 2012, and identified in seized drug samples by analytical laboratories in the UK and other European countries.

In mice, tt is an NMDA receptor antagonist and AMPA and 5-HT2 receptor agonist.

Legal Status

As of October 2015 NENK is a controlled substance in the United Kingdom, China, and the US state of Alabama.

References

Arylcyclohexylamines
Chloroarenes
Designer drugs
Dissociative drugs
Euphoriants